The Play-offs of the 2016 Fed Cup Americas Zone Group II were the final stages of the Group II Zonal Competition involving teams from the Americas. Using the positions determined in their pools, the nine teams faced off to determine their placing in the 2016 Fed Cup Americas Zone Group II. The top two teams advanced to Group I for the next year.

Promotional play-offs 
The first and second placed teams of the two pools were drawn in head-to-head rounds. The winners advanced to Group I.

Venezuela vs. Guatemala

Puerto Rico vs. Chile

Fifth place play-off
The third placed teams of the two pools were drawn in head-to-head rounds to determine the 5th and 6th placings.

Honduras vs. Uruguay

Seventh place play-off
The fourth placed teams of the two pools were drawn in head-to-head rounds to determine the 7th and 8th placings.

Costa Rica vs. Dominican Republic

Final placements

  and  advanced to Group I.

See also
 Fed Cup structure

References

External links
 Fed Cup website

2016 Fed Cup Americas Zone